If I Told You is the fourth album released by Irish singer Aoife Ní Fhearraigh. It consists of  Traditional Irish and contemporary songs, and its lyrics are  sung in Irish and English.

Track listing
 Love And Freedom  
 Where Are You Tonight  
 Lullaby  
 Crann Úll  
 If I Told You  
 Parting Glass   
 Into The West  
 Gabhaim Molta Bríghde  
 Siúil A Rún  
 If This Be Love  
 Long Hard Night  
 Táimse i M'Codhladh  
 An Seanduine Dóite  
 An Buachaillín Donn  
 Maid That Sold Her Barley

External links
 Official website - Aoife
 'If I Told You' on Amazon

2006 albums
Aoife Ní Fhearraigh albums